Reurbanisation refers to the movement of people back into an area that has been previously abandoned.
Reurbanisation is usually a government's initiative to counter the problem of inner city decline. Inner-city decline usually occurs when problems such as pollution, overpopulation, inadequate housing, etc. arise.

References

Urban development